Harrison is an unincorporated community in Clay County, West Virginia, United States.

References

Unincorporated communities in Clay County, West Virginia
Unincorporated communities in West Virginia